Speciality is the third album from Japanese pop singer Nami Tamaki. The album was Tamaki's second to reach number one on the Oricon charts.

Sanctuary, Tamaki's 12th single and the first one released from the Specialty album, was used as the opening theme for the anime, Kiba, for episodes 1 - 26.  It charted for 5 weeks on Oricon, peaking at number 12.

Track listing 
source: Oricon profile
"Speciality" (instrumental)
"Result"
"Identity"
"New World"
"Sunrize"
"Castaway"
"No Way Back"
"Sanctuary"
"Get Wild"
"Reach for the Rainbow"
"My Way"
"Ready Steady Go!"

References

External links
 Album Oricon profile 

Nami Tamaki albums
2006 albums